Al-Lama'an is a sub-district located in the Al A'rsh District, Al Bayda Governorate, Yemen. Al-Lama'an had a population of 1093 according to the 2004 census.

References 

Sub-districts in Al A'rsh District